Nay Aru (or Nai Aru) is the name of two rivers in Northern Province, Sri Lanka:

 Nay Aru (Mannar), in Mannar District and Vavuniya District
 Nay Aru (Mullaitivu), in Mullaitivu District